is a Japanese manga series written and illustrated by Tadataka Kawasaki. It was serialized in Media Factory's Monthly Comic Flapper magazine from April 2014 to September 2018. A 12-episode anime television series adaptation by Diomedéa aired from July to September 2018.

Plot
The story features a simple premise—high school girl Chio Miyamo walking from her house to her school. What happens between these two points, however, varies from day to day, ranging from strange conversations with her friend Manana Nonomura, dealing with biker gangs, and performing death-defying feats of parkour.

Characters

Chio is a high school girl who experiences all sorts of craziness on her commute to school. She is an avid gamer, particularly of Western video games, and occasionally tries to put her game experience into practice with varying degrees of success. 

Manana is Chio's best friend who has been with her since elementary school. Despite their close friendship, the two will occasionally try to backstab each other.

Yuki is Chio's classmate who is a sports ace. She is very polite and often oblivious to how people see her.

Momo is a member of the public morals committee at Chio's school who has a crush on her teacher, Gotō.

Madoka is a senior student at Chio's school who is captain of the Kabaddi Club. She has a strong passion for kabaddi, which she ultimately comes to realize is not based in the sport itself, but rather for it being the perfect excuse to grope other girls.

Gotō is a teacher at Chio's school who always waits at the school gates as students come in every morning. While stern, he deeply cares for his students and greatly enjoys his job.

Mayuta is a former biker gang leader who is tricked by Chio into quitting his gang and now seeks to earn an honest living as a convenience store clerk. He has a crush on Chio and often goes to absurd lengths to impress her.

Chiharu is Mayuta's younger sister who has a bad habit of trying to poke other people's bottoms. She loves her older brother dearly and is driven to find the woman who made him quit his gang.

Media

Manga
Chio's School Road, written and illustrated by Tadataka Kawasaki, was serialized in Media Factory's Monthly Comic Flapper magazine from April 5, 2014, to September 5, 2018. Nine tankōbon volumes were published from September 23, 2014, to September 21, 2018. The series is licensed in North America by Yen Press.

Anime
A 12-episode anime television series adaptation was originally scheduled to premiere in April 2018, but the release date was pushed back to July 6, and it concluded on September 21, 2018. It was directed and written by Takayuki Inagaki at Diomedéa, with character designs by Mayuko Matsumoto. Crunchyroll streamed the series with English subtitles, while Funimation produced a SimulDub.

Notes

References

External links
Manga official site 
Anime official website 

2014 manga
2018 anime television series debuts
Comedy anime and manga
Crunchyroll anime
Diomedéa
Kadokawa Dwango franchises
Media Factory manga
School life in anime and manga
Seinen manga
Tokyo MX original programming
Yen Press titles